John Donnell may refer to:
 John Randolph Donnell, oilman, banker and philanthropist, involved in Scouting
 John R. Donnell Jr., his son, involved in Scouting

See also
 John O'Donnell (disambiguation)